PF1, PF-1, PF01, PF-01, or variant, may refer to:

 PSA PF1 platform, the "PF1" platform from PSA
 pf1, a bacteriophage code, see List of MeSH codes (B04)
 Pf1, a Pseudomonas phage, see List of viruses
 Posnansky/Fronius PF-1 White Knight, model PF-1 glider "White Knight" from Posnansky/Fronius
 , "PF-1" ship number USN patrol frigate USS Asheville
 , "PF-1" ship number Thai patrol frigate HTMS Tachin
 Shenyang PF-1, model PF-1 jet engine from Shenyang
 MANOI PF01, model PF01 in the MANOI series of robots
 PF01 (Powered Flight 01), a test flight in the test program for SpaceShipTwo
 Pf-01, a composition by composer Carlos Sandoval
 PF-01, a grade used in coin grading

See also
 PF (disambiguation)